Miller Thomson (born 20 July 2004) is a Scottish professional footballer who plays for Scottish Premiership club Dundee United as a midfielder. He made his senior debut in 2022. aged 17.

Club career 
Miller Thomson joined the Dundee United Academy at the age of 11 and graduated through the Scottish Football Association Performance School at St John's Roman Catholic High School in Dundee. In February 2022 he extended his contract with Dundee United until 2024 after good performances for the under-18 team and having been included in the first team squad. He made his first team debut aged 17, as a substitute in a 3–0 Scottish Cup defeat against Celtic on 14 March 2022. In United's next match, away to St Mirren in the Scottish Premiership, Thomson made his first starting appearance, but was substituted at half time.

References

External links

2004 births
Living people
Scottish footballers
Association football midfielders
Dundee United F.C. players
Scottish Professional Football League players